Calculation (also known as Broken Intervals, Hopscotch and Four Kings Solitaire) is a solitaire card game played with a standard pack of 52 cards.  It is part of the Sir Tommy family of patience games.  It has its origin in France, where it is known as La Plus Belle.

It offers more scope for skill than many similar games; a skilled player can win Calculation more than 80% of the time when "normal play" can allow winning 1 in 5 times.  Good strategy typically sees players use 6s, 8s, and Queens early and 10s, Jacks, and Kings later; clever placement of cards in the waste is also critical, with some players reserving one waste pile for the Kings.

Rules
At the start of play, an ace, two, three, and four of any suit are removed from a standard deck of cards and laid out as the foundations. The ace foundation is to be built up in sequence until the king is reached, regardless of suit. The other foundations are similarly built up, but by twos, threes, and fours, respectively, until they each reach a king, as in the following table:

The tableau, initially empty, consists of four piles of cards, usually arranged immediately below the four foundations.

Play in Calculation is simple.  A single card is turned up from the stock and played either to the top of any of the four tableau piles, or onto one of the foundations if desired.  The top card of any tableau pile may also be played onto one of the foundation piles if it is the next number in the appropriate sequence for that foundation.  The game is won when all cards have been played onto the foundations, and lost when no further play is possible.

Variants
As a variation, cards may be played from the stock to a waste pile which holds one card, and played from there to a foundation or tableau, instead of being played from the stock to a foundation or tableau as soon as they are turned over. In Betsy Ross, there is no tableau and only the single waste pile, but three such deals from the deck are allowed.

Variations which make Calculation more difficult are to play all 52 cards without the starting A,2,3,4 on the foundations, or to use only three instead of four tableau piles.  Playing with both these variations makes the game quite difficult, but a very skilled player will still be able to win at least two games out of three.

Devil's Grip is a broadly related game with similar game-play to Calculation, using two-decks stripped of the Aces,  and playing cards to a 3x8 grid where cards increase by three in rank.

One234 is a Calculation style game with completely open information but a low probability of success; it begins with a tableau of 8 columns with 6 cards each laid out face-up at the start of the game. Closely related to One234 is its easier variant Appreciate.

Another spin off from Calculation is Betsy Ross.

References

See also
 Sir Tommy
 Betsy Ross
 List of solitaires
 Glossary of solitaire

French card games
Single-deck patience card games
Planners (games)